The 2009–10 season will be Persepolis's 9th season in the Pro League, and their 27th consecutive season in the top division of Iranian football. They will also be competing in the Hazfi Cup. They've had many problems in summer such as their chairman not being certain about his position or not having a head coach until two weeks before the league started and their last problem was about Ali Karimi's contract who was their best player the year before who later joined Steel Azin.

Squad

Iran Pro League

Persian Gulf Cup

Matches 

Last updated 18 May 2010

Results by round

Results summary

League standings

Top scorers and assists

Goal scorers 
10 Goals
  Karim Bagheri

8 Goals
  Hadi Norouzi

6 Goals
  Mohsen Khalili

5 Goals
  Hawar Mulla Mohammed

4 Goals
  Sepehr Heidari

3 Goals
  Maysam Baou

2 Goals
  Mojtaba Zarei
  Wésley Brasilia

1 Goal
  Sheys Rezaei
  Mohammad Parvin
  Adel Kolahkaj
  Shpejtim Arifi
  Tiago Alves Fraga

Assists 

4 Assists
  Mohsen Khalili
  Mehdi Shiri

3 Assists
  Hadi Norouzi
  Mojtaba Zarei
  Hawar Mulla Mohammed

2 Assists
  Sheys Rezaei
  Alireza Mohammad
  Karim Bagheri
  Ebrahim Shakouri

1 Assist
  Adel Kolahkaj
  Maysam Baou
  Nabiollah Bagheriha
  Hossein Badamaki
  Hamidreza Aliasgari
  Wésley Brasilia
  Tiago Alves Fraga

Cards

Matches played 

29
  Sepehr Heidari

Hazfi Cup 200910

Last updated 24 May 2010

Scorers

Goals 

Four goals
  Mohsen Khalili

Three goals
  Karim Bagheri

One goal
  Sheys Rezaei
  Hamidreza Aliasgari
  Hawar Mulla Mohammed
  Tiago Alves Fraga

Assists 

Three assists
  Hawar Mulla Mohammed

One assist
  Hadi Norouzi
  Alireza Mohammad

Cards

Friendly matches

28 July 2009
Persepolis 2-2 Paykan 
Hadi Norouzi  
Wésley Brasilia 

10 August 2009
Persepolis 3-0 Fajr Moghavemat 
Karim Bagheri  
Akbar Saghiri  
Mohammad Parvin 

17 August 2009
Persepolis 1-2 Salar Shemiran 
Mohammad Mehdi Elhaei 

2 September 2009
Persepolis 3-0  Al-Ahli 
Maysam Baou  
Saeid Hallafi  
Mehdi Shiri 

15 September 2009
Persepolis 5-2 Dehdari Mashhad 
Hawar Mulla (2) 
Hamidreza Aliasgari  
Saman Aghazamani  
Ebrahim Shakouri 

21 September 2009
Persepolis 3-3 Shensa Save 
Hawar Mulla  
Akbar Saghiri  
Mohammad Parvin 

12 October 2009
Persepolis 6-1 Ehsan Ray 
Mohammad Mansouri  
Mohsen Khalili  
Shpejtim Arifi (3)  
Mohammad Parvin 

15 November 2009
Persepolis 1-0  Ocean Marin 
Akbar Saghiri 

19 November 2009
Persepolis 1-1  Al-Nahda 
Mohsen Khalili 

31 December 2009
Persepolis 1-0  Hatta 
Mohammad Parvin 

3 January 2010
Persepolis 1-1  Al-Rayyan 
Mohammad Mansouri 
Hamidreza Aliasgari 

26 March 2010
Persepolis 2-4  Salem Saad XI 
Hadi Norouzi 
Hamidreza Aliasgari 

28 March 2010
Persepolis 5-1  Al-Nasr 
Mohsen Khalili (P)
Karim Bagheri 
Mohammad Mansouri 
Hamidreza Aliasgari 
Mohammad Mehdi Elhaei (P)
Alireza Mohammad

Al-Nasr International Tournament 

29 August 2009
Persepolis 1(7)-1(6)   Al Karamah S.C. 
Hassan Abbas 
Mehdi Shiri 

Penalties:

Parvin Arifi Shakouri Brasilia Rezaei Ali Asgari Bagheriha 

Final
31 August 2009
Persepolis  0-2   Al-Nasr 
Mohammad Parvin

Club

Kit 

|
|
|

Club managers

Club officials
{| class=wikitable
! Position   !!Name 
|-
|President ||  Habib Kashani (temporary)
|-
|Director ||  Mahmoud Khordbin
|-
|Academy President ||  Fereydoun Moeini
|-
|Media Officer & International Committee President||  Morteza Hosseinzadeh Zarabi
|-
|Financial Officer ||   Ali Akbar Ashouri
|-
|Juridical Officer ||  Mostafa Shokripour
|-
|Cultural Officer ||  Hojat'ol eslam Seyyed Mohammad Kohnegi
|-
|Chairman & Spokesman of board of Directors ||  Majid Farrokhzadi
|-

Captains 
1. Karim Bagheri <br/ >
2. Sheys Rezaei <br/ >
3. Alireza Haghighi <br/ >
4. Mojtaba Shiri <br/ >
5. Hossein Badamaki

Squad changes during 200910 season

In

Out

References

Persepolis F.C. seasons
Persepolis